Alexandre Beljame (November 26, 1842September 19, 1906) was a French writer.

Life
He was born at Villiers-le-Bel, Val-d'Oise. He spent part of his childhood in England and was a frequent visitor in London. His lectures on English literature at the Sorbonne, where a chair was created expressly for him, did much to promote the study of English in France. In 1905–1906 he was Clark lecturer on English literature at Trinity College, Cambridge. He died at Domont (Val-d'Oise) on September 19, 1906.

His best known book was a masterly study of the conditions of literary life in England in the 18th century illustrated by the lives of Dryden, Addison and Pope. This book, Le Public et les hommes de lettres en Angleterre au XVIII' siècle (1881), was crowned by the French Academy on the appearance of the second edition in 1897. He was a good Shakespearian scholar, and his editions of Macbeth, Othello and Julius Caesar also received an academic prize in 1902.

References

Attribution:
 
 Jean-Pierre Mouchon, "Alexandre Beljame" in "Dictionnaire bio-bibliographique des anglicistes et assimilés" (Marseilles, France, Terra Beata, 2010).

1842 births
1906 deaths
People from Villiers-le-Bel
Academics of the University of Cambridge
Academic staff of the University of Paris
19th-century French historians
French literary critics
Shakespearean scholars
French male dramatists and playwrights
French male poets